Oxydoras sifontesi, the Sierra Copora, is a species of thorny catfish found in the Orinoco River basin in Colombia and Venezuela.  This species grows to a length of  TL.

References 
 

Doradidae
Catfish of South America
Freshwater fish of Colombia
Fish of Venezuela
Taxa named by Augustín Fernández-Yépez
Fish described in 1968